Alfred Melville Pride (September 10, 1897 – December 24, 1988) was a United States Navy admiral and pioneer naval aviator, who distinguished himself during World War II as an aircraft carrier commander.

He served during the late 1940s as Chief of the Bureau of Aeronautics and during the Korean War as Commander of the U.S. Seventh Fleet. Pride's career was remarkable for its time, in that he achieved flag rank without having attended the United States Naval Academy or even completing college. (He did, however, later complete advanced studies in aeronautical engineering.)

A native of Somerville, Massachusetts, he studied engineering at Tufts University in Medford, Massachusetts, for several years before dropping out to enlist in the Navy during World War I.  He served first as a machinist's mate in the Naval Reserve, but was soon given the chance to receive flight training and gain a commission as an ensign.  Pride was sent to France, where he served briefly during the latter part of the war.

In the early 1920s, having joined the Regular Navy, Pride became involved in the experiments to develop U.S. aircraft carriers.  He served aboard the USS Langley, the converted coaling ship that became the Navy's first aircraft carrier, and also took part in the development of the carriers USS Saratoga and USS Lexington, as a member of the original crews.

Pride continued his work in Naval Aviation testing for the rest of the interwar period.  He went on to study aeronautical engineering at the Massachusetts Institute of Technology (MIT).  In 1931, he became the first person to land an Autogiro (precursor to the helicopter) on an aircraft carrier.  From 1934–1936 he headed the Flight Test Section at Naval Air Station Anacostia, Washington, D.C., at that time the Navy's center for aircraft testing.

During World War II, Pride served as first commanding officer of the carrier USS Belleau Wood (CVL-24).  He received promotion to rear admiral and became commandant of 14th Naval District, at Pearl Harbor, Hawaii.  He then was moved out to fleet jobs, including command of Carrier Division Six and Carrier Division Four.

After the war, Rear Admiral Pride held important positions relating to Naval Aviation's technical development.  From 1947 to 1951 he served as chief of the Bureau of Aeronautics, the Navy's material organization for aviation.  From 1952 to 1953, he commanded the Naval Air Test Center, Patuxent River, Maryland.

He returned to the Pacific in 1953, when he received promotion to vice admiral, command of the U.S. Seventh Fleet (December 1, 1953 – December 19, 1955) and the first commander of the United States Taiwan Defense Command (USTDC).  During this time, he was featured on the cover of the Time magazine (February 7, 1955, issue).  Pride served as head of the Seventh Fleet until 1956, when he became Commander, Air Forces, Pacific Fleet.

Pride retired in 1959 as a full admiral and settled in Arlington, Virginia, where he died in 1988, aged 91. He is buried in Arlington National Cemetery in Arlington, Virginia.

Many of his papers are stored at the Archives Division of the Smithsonian Institution's National Air and Space Museum, Washington, D.C.

Awards and honors
Navy Distinguished Service Medal with gold star
Legion of Merit with combat "V" device
Navy Commendation Medal with combat "V" device
Presidential Unit Citation with star
World War I Victory Medal with clasp
American Defense Service Medal with clasp
American Campaign Medal
Asiatic-Pacific Campaign Medal with silver battle star
World War II Victory Medal
Philippine Liberation Medal

His honors included being a Companion of the Naval Order of the United States and a member of the National Museum of Naval Aviation's Hall of Honor. The Navy Department also established the Admiral Alfred M. Pride Frigate ASW Readiness Award, for excellence in Anti-Submarine Warfare in the Navy's surface force.

In 1961, Pride was retroactively designated the ninth recipient of the Gray Eagle Award, as the most senior active naval aviator from July 1959 until his retirement later that year.

References
Alfred M. Pride Biography from Justin Museum of Military History: Oral History, Navy Biographies
History of the USS Belleau Wood CVL-24, edited by R.D. Fread, Justin Museum of Military History
Rutgers University New Brunswick History Department Oral History Archives of World War II Interview with William Gutter about his recollections of serving as aboard USS Belleau Wood during Pride's time as commanding officer
Listing of members of the National Museum of Naval Aviation's Hall of Honor
ADM Pride on the cover of the February 7, 1955 issue of Time magazine
Reference to the Admiral Alfred M. Pride Frigate ASW Readiness Award, from the Navy's Surface Force Training Manual, Revision E 12/17/99 – From the Federation of American Scientists (FAS)
Smithsonian Institution Research Information System (SIRIS) – Search the Archives, Manuscripts and Photographs Catalog for information on Pride's papers

1897 births
1988 deaths
People from Somerville, Massachusetts
Military personnel from Massachusetts
American aerospace engineers
United States Naval Aviators
United States Navy admirals
United States Navy personnel of World War I
United States Navy World War II admirals
Recipients of the Navy Distinguished Service Medal
Recipients of the Legion of Merit
Burials at Arlington National Cemetery
Engineers from Maryland
Engineers from Massachusetts
20th-century American engineers
United States Navy reservists